
Year 249 (CCXLIX) was a common year starting on Monday (link will display the full calendar) of the Julian calendar. At the time, it was known as the Year of the Consulship of Gavius and Aquilinus (or, less frequently, year 1002 Ab urbe condita). The denomination 249 for this year has been used since the early medieval period, when the Anno Domini calendar era became the prevalent method in Europe for naming years.

Events 
 By place 
 Roman Empire 
 Trajan Decius puts down a revolt in Moesia and Pannonia. Loyal legionaries proclaim him emperor, and he leads them into Italy. 
 Battle of Verona: Decius defeats and kills Emperor Philip the Arab.
 Decius begins persecuting Christians, and others refusing to participate in Emperor worship.

 Asia 
 February 5 – Incident at Gaoping Tombs: In the Chinese state of Cao Wei, regent Sima Yi, in a coup d'état, forces his co-regent Cao Shuang to relinquish his power, after taking control of the capital city of Luoyang. Sima Yi issues a memorial, which lists the various crimes he and his associates has committed.

 By topic 
 Religion 
 In Alexandria, the populace pillages the homes of Christians.

Births 
 Shi Chong (or Jilun), Chinese politician and statesman

Deaths 
 February 9 
 Bi Gui (or Zhaoxian), Chinese politician
 Cao Shuang, Chinese general and regent
 Deng Yang (or Xuanmao), Chinese politician
 He Yan (or Pingshu), Chinese philosopher
 Huan Fan (or Yuanze), Chinese general
 Li Sheng (or Gongzhao), Chinese politician
 May 18 – Jiang Ji (or Zitong), Chinese general
 Jotapianus (or Jotapian), Roman usurper
 Ma Zhong (or Dexin), Chinese general and politician
 Philip II (the Younger), Roman emperor (b. 237)
 Philip the Arab, Roman general and emperor (b. 204)
 Quan Cong, Chinese general and politician (b. 198)
 Wang Bi, Chinese philosopher and politician (b. 226)
 Xu Miao (or Jingshan), Chinese politician (b. 172)
 Zhu Ran, Chinese adviser and general (b. 182)

References